Jesús Antonio de la Cruz Gallego (born 7 May 1947) is a Spanish former football defender and manager.

He appeared in 247 La Liga games over the course of nine seasons, scoring a total of six goals for Granada and Barcelona. He won three titles with the latter club, including the 1979 Cup Winners' Cup.

A Spain international in the 70s, de la Cruz appeared for his country at the 1978 World Cup.

Club career
Born in León, de la Cruz started his senior career with Real Valladolid in Segunda División. Even though he suffered relegation at the end of the 1969–70 season, he moved straight into La Liga with Granada CF, making his debut in the competition on 13 September 1970 in a 1–1 away draw against Elche CF.

In early March 1972, de la Cruz signed with fellow league club FC Barcelona for six million pesetas, pending a medical that almost went wrong and with the deal being made effective in July. He went on to feature in more than 230 official matches during his tenure at the Camp Nou, scoring his first goal on 7 January 1973 in a 2–0 win at Real Zaragoza. On 16 May 1979, the 32-year-old came on as a second-half substitute in the final of the UEFA Cup Winners' Cup in Basel, the 4–3 extra time defeat of Fortuna Düsseldorf.

De la Cruz worked as a coach after retiring. This included two brief spells with CE Sabadell FC, also in Catalonia (which included top-level relegation in the 1987–88 campaign).

In January 2003, following the dismissal of Louis van Gaal and prior to the appointment of Radomir Antić, de la Cruz was named interim manager at Barcelona. He was in charge of the squad for one league match, a 0–3 away loss to Atlético Madrid.

International career
De la Cruz collected six caps for Spain, in as many years. His debut arrived on 12 April 1972, in a 0–0 friendly draw in Greece.

Selected by coach László Kubala for the 1978 FIFA World Cup, de la Cruz took part in the 1–2 group stage defeat against Austria, as the tournament in Argentina ended after three games.

Honours

Club
Barcelona
La Liga: 1973–74
Copa del Rey: 1977–78
UEFA Cup Winners' Cup: 1978–79

Managerial statistics (Japan only)

References

External links

1947 births
Living people
Sportspeople from León, Spain
Spanish footballers
Footballers from Castile and León
Association football defenders
La Liga players
Segunda División players
Real Valladolid players
Granada CF footballers
FC Barcelona players
Spain under-23 international footballers
Spain international footballers
1978 FIFA World Cup players
Spanish football managers
La Liga managers
Segunda División managers
Segunda División B managers
CE Sabadell FC managers
FC Barcelona managers
J1 League managers
Yokohama F. Marinos managers
Spanish expatriate football managers
Expatriate football managers in Japan
Spanish expatriate sportspeople in Japan